Adam Pavlesic (born 30 July 2002) is an Australian professional footballer who plays as a goalkeeper for Sydney FC.

Career 
On 26 November 2020 he made his professional debut in a 2020 AFC Champions League clash against Jeonbuk Hyundai Motors.

Pavlesic made his competitive A-League debut during Round 21 of the 2021-22 season against Western Sydney in the Sydney Derby in which Sydney ran out 3-2 winners.

References

External links

2002 births
Living people
Australian soccer players
Association football goalkeepers
Sydney FC players
National Premier Leagues players
Sydney United 58 FC players
Australian people of Croatian descent